Kristofers "Kris" Bindulis (born September 17, 1995) is a Latvian professional ice hockey defenseman. He is currently playing for HC Motor České Budějovice of the Czech Extraliga (ELH).

Playing career
Bindulis first played two seasons in his native Latvia from 2011 to 2013 before opting to further develop his game in the United States. He first played in the North American Hockey League with the Soo Eagles in 2013–14 before splitting the following year between the Eagles and the Des Moines Buccaneers of the United States Hockey League.

In the 2016–17 season, he was recruited to play collegiate hockey with Lake Superior State University of the Western Collegiate Hockey Association. As a freshman he contributed with 1 goal and 12 points in 28 games before opting to conclude his collegiate career in signing a three-year entry level contract with the Washington Capitals on March 8, 2017.

Bindulis split the tenure of his entry-level contract between the Capitals' affiliate's the Hershey Bears of the American Hockey League (AHL) and the South Carolina Stingrays of the ECHL. At the conclusion of his three-year deal, Bindulis left North America as a restricted free agent from the Capitals and signed a one-year contract with German club, Krefeld Pinguine of the DEL, on 5 August 2020.

International play
Bindulis played in two junior tournament with the Latvian national junior team at the 2013 World Under-18 Championships and the Division I 2015 World Junior Championships.

He was later selected and made his senior debut for Latvia at the 2017 IIHF World Championship, appearing in 5 games.

Career statistics

Regular season and playoffs

International

References

External links

1995 births
Living people
Des Moines Buccaneers players
Hershey Bears players
Krefeld Pinguine players
Lake Superior State Lakers men's ice hockey players
Latvian ice hockey defencemen
Latvian expatriate ice hockey people
Motor České Budějovice players
South Carolina Stingrays players
Ice hockey people from Riga
Latvian expatriate sportspeople in the United States
Latvian expatriate sportspeople in the Czech Republic
Latvian expatriate sportspeople in Germany
Expatriate ice hockey players in the United States
Expatriate ice hockey players in Germany
Expatriate ice hockey players in the Czech Republic